Opsanus is a genus of toadfishes found in the western Atlantic Ocean. It currently has six recognised species, with the latest one described in 2005.

Species
The recognized species in this genus are:
 Opsanus beta (Goode & T. H. Bean, 1880) (Gulf toadfish)
 Opsanus brasiliensis Rotundo, Spinelli & Zavala-Camin, 2005 (considered by some sources to be a junior synonym of O. tau)
 Opsanus dichrostomus Collette, 2001 (bicolor toadfish)
 Opsanus pardus (Goode & T. H. Bean, 1880) (leopard toadfish)
 Opsanus phobetron Walters & C. R. Robins, 1961 (scarecrow toadfish)
 Opsanus tau (Linnaeus, 1766) (oyster toadfish)

References

 
Batrachoididae
Taxa named by Constantine Samuel Rafinesque